Franz Schubert's compositions of 1824 are mostly in the Deutsch catalogue (D) range D 799–822, and include:
 Instrumental works:
 Octet, D 803
 String Quartet No. 13, D 804 (Rosamunde)
 String Quartet No. 14, D 810 (Death and the Maiden)
 Arpeggione Sonata, D 821
 Sonata in C major for piano four-hands, D 812 (Grand Duo)
 Vocal music:
 "Gebet", D 815

Table

Legend

List

|-
| 799
| 799
| data-sort-value="XXX,1832" | (1832)
| data-sort-value="2008,463" | XX, 8No. 463
| data-sort-value="413,00" | IV, 13
| Im Abendrot, D 799
| data-sort-value="text Oh, wie schon ist deine Welt" | Oh, wie schön ist deine Welt
| data-sort-value="1824-01-01" | 1824 orFeb. 1825
| data-sort-value="Text by Lappe, Karl, Oh, wie schon ist deine Welt"| Text by 
|-
| 800
| 800
| data-sort-value="041,1825-0" | 41(1825)(1827)
| data-sort-value="2008,465" | XX, 8No. 465
| data-sort-value="402,0410" | IV, 2a
| data-sort-value="Einsame, Der" | Der Einsame
| data-sort-value="text Wann meine Grillen schwirren" | Wann meine Grillen schwirren
| data-sort-value="1825-01-01" | early 1825
|-
| 801
| 801
| data-sort-value="060,1826-2" | 60,2(1826)
| data-sort-value="2008,457" | XX, 8No. 457
| data-sort-value="403,00" | IV, 3
| data-sort-value="Dithyrambe, D 801" | Dithyrambe, D 801
| data-sort-value="text Nimmer, das glaubt mir, erscheinen die Gotter 2" | Nimmer, das glaubt mir, erscheinen die Götter
| data-sort-value="1826-06-10" | before10/6/1826
| data-sort-value="Text by Schiller, Friedrich, Nimmer, das glaubt mir, erscheinen die Gotter 2" | Text by Schiller; For b and piano
|-
| 802
| 802
| data-sort-value="160,1850-0" | 160p(1850)
| data-sort-value="0800,007" | VIIINo. 7
| data-sort-value="608,05" | VI, 8 No. 5& anh. 2
| Variations on "Trockne Blumen"
| data-sort-value="key E minor" | E minor
| data-sort-value="1824-01-01" | January1824
| For flute and piano; Introduction, Theme ( No. 18) and 7 Variations
|-
| 803
| 803
| data-sort-value="166,1851-0" | 166p(1851)(1898)
| data-sort-value="0300,001" | III No. 1
| data-sort-value="601,03" | VI, 1 No. 3
| Octet, D 803
| data-sort-value="key F major" | F major
| data-sort-value="1824-03-01" | February–1/3/1824
| For clarinet, bassoon, horn, string quartet and double bass; Movements 4 and 5 missing in 1st publ.
|-
| 804
| 804
| data-sort-value="029,1824" | 29(1824)
| data-sort-value="0500,013" | V No. 13
| data-sort-value="605,14" | VI, 5No. 14
| data-sort-value="String Quartet, D 804" | String Quartet No. 13 Rosamunde
| data-sort-value="key A minor" | A minor
| data-sort-value="1824-03-01" | Feb.–earlyMarch 1824
| Allegro ma non troppo – Andante (after  No. 5) – Minuet – Allegro moderato
|-
| 805
| 805
| data-sort-value="XXX,1833" | (1833)
| data-sort-value="2008,458" | XX, 8No. 458
| data-sort-value="413,00" | IV, 13
| data-sort-value="Sieg, Der" | Der Sieg
| data-sort-value="text O unbewolktes Leben" | O unbewölktes Leben
| data-sort-value="1824-03-01" | early March1824
| data-sort-value="Text by Mayrhofer, Johann, O unbewolktes Leben" | Text by Mayrhofer; For b and piano
|-
| 806
| 806
| data-sort-value="XXX,1833" | (1833)
| data-sort-value="2008,459" | XX, 8No. 459
| data-sort-value="413,00" | IV, 13
| Abendstern
| data-sort-value="text Was weilst du einsam an dem Himmel" | Was weilst du einsam an dem Himmel
| data-sort-value="1824-03-01" | early March1824
| data-sort-value="Text by Mayrhofer, Johann, Was weilst du einsam an dem Himmel" | Text by Mayrhofer
|-
| 807
| 807
| data-sort-value="XXX,1842" | (1842)
| data-sort-value="2008,460" | XX, 8No. 460
| data-sort-value="413,00" | IV, 13
| data-sort-value="Auflosung" | Auflösung
| data-sort-value="text Verbirg dich, Sonne" | Verbirg dich, Sonne
| data-sort-value="1824-03-01" | March 1824
| data-sort-value="Text by Mayrhofer, Johann, Verbirg dich, Sonne" | Text by Mayrhofer
|-
| 808
| 808
| data-sort-value="XXX,1872" | (1872)
| data-sort-value="2008,461" | XX, 8No. 461
| data-sort-value="413,00" | IV, 13
| Gondelfahrer, D 808
| data-sort-value="text Es tanzen Mond und Sterne 1" | Es tanzen Mond und Sterne
| data-sort-value="1824-03-01" | early March1824
| data-sort-value="Text by Mayrhofer, Johann, Es tanzen Mond und Sterne 1" | Text by Mayrhofer
|-
| 809
| 809
| data-sort-value="028,1824" | 28(1824)
| data-sort-value="1600,009" | XVINo. 9
| data-sort-value="303,32" | III, 3 No. 32
| Gondelfahrer, D 809
| data-sort-value="text Es tanzen Mond und Sterne 2" | Es tanzen Mond und Sterne
| data-sort-value="1824-03-01" | March 1824
| data-sort-value="Text by Mayrhofer, Johann, Es tanzen Mond und Sterne 2" | Text by Mayrhofer; For ttbb and piano
|-
| 810
| 810
| data-sort-value="XXX,1831" | (1831)
| data-sort-value="0500,014" | V No. 14
| data-sort-value="605,15" | VI, 5No. 15
| data-sort-value="String Quartet, D 810" | String Quartet No. 14 Death and the Maiden
| data-sort-value="key D minor" | D minor
| data-sort-value="1824-03-01" | March 1824
| Allegro – Andante con moto (after ) – Scherzo – Presto
|-
| 811
| 811
| data-sort-value="149,1850-0" | 149p(1850)
| data-sort-value="1400,019" | XIV No. 19
| data-sort-value="109,014" | I, 9No. 14
| Salve Regina, D 811
| data-sort-value="key C major" | C majorSalve Regina
| data-sort-value="1824-03-01" | April 1824
| data-sort-value="Text: Salve Regina 6" | Text: Salve Regina (other settings: , 106, 223, 386 and 676); For ttbb
|-
| 812
| 812
| data-sort-value="140,1837-0" | 140p(1837)
| data-sort-value="0902,012" | IX, 2No. 12
| data-sort-value="712,01" | VII/1,2 No. 1
| Sonata, D 812, a.k.a. Grand Duo
| data-sort-value="key C major" | C major
| data-sort-value="1824-06-01" | June 1824
| For piano duet; Allegro moderato – Andante – Scherzo – Allegro vivace
|-
| 813
| 813
| data-sort-value="035,1825" | 35(1825)
| data-sort-value="0902,016" | IX, 2No. 16
| data-sort-value="712,02" | VII/1,2 No. 2
| data-sort-value="Variations, 08, on an original theme" | Eight Variations on an original theme
| data-sort-value="key A-flat major" | A major
| data-sort-value="1824-07-15" | late May–midJuly 1824
| For piano duet
|-
| 814
| 814
| data-sort-value="XXX,1869" | (1869)
| data-sort-value="0903,027" | IX, 3No. 27
| data-sort-value="714,12" | VII/1, 4
| data-sort-value="Landler, 04, D 814" | Four Ländler, D 814
| data-sort-value="key I" | Various keys
| data-sort-value="1824-07-01" | July 1824
| For piano duet; No. 1 also as Allemande  No. 17
|-
| 815
| 815
| data-sort-value="139,1840-1" | 139pI(1840)
| data-sort-value="1700,010" | XVIINo. 10
| data-sort-value="302,14" | III, 2aNo. 14
| Gebet, D 815
| data-sort-value="text Du Urquell aller Gute" | Du Urquell aller Güte
| data-sort-value="1824-09-01" | September1824
| data-sort-value="Text by Motte Fouque, Friedrich de la, Du Urquell aller Gute" | Text by Motte Fouqué; For satb and piano
|-
| 816
| 816
| data-sort-value="XXX,1956" | (1956)
| data-sort-value="ZZZZ" |
| data-sort-value="726,00" | VII/2, 6
| data-sort-value="Ecossaises, 03" | Three Écossaises
| data-sort-value="key I" | Various keys
| data-sort-value="1824-09-01" | September1824
| For piano
|-
| 817
| 817
| data-sort-value="XXX,1928" | (1928)
| data-sort-value="ZZZZ" |
| data-sort-value="725,03" | VII/2, 5
| Ungarische Melodie
| data-sort-value="key B minor" | B minor
| data-sort-value="1824-09-02" | 2/9/1824
| For piano; Reappears in 
|-
| 818
| 818
| data-sort-value="054,1826-0" | 54(1826)
| data-sort-value="0903,019" | IX, 3No. 19
| data-sort-value="712,03" | VII/1,2 No. 3
| data-sort-value="Divertissement a l'hongroise" | Divertissement à l'hongroise
| data-sort-value="key G minor" | G minor
| data-sort-value="1824-09-21" | autumn1824?
| For piano duet; Partly based on 
|-
| 819
| 819
| data-sort-value="040,1825-0" | 40(1825)
| data-sort-value="0901,002" | IX, 1No. 2
| data-sort-value="714,03" | VII/1, 4
| data-sort-value="Grandes Marches, 6" | Six Grandes Marches
| data-sort-value="key I" | Various keys
| data-sort-value="1818-01-01" | 1818 or1824
| For piano duet
|-
| 820
| 820
| data-sort-value="XXX,1931" | (1931)
| data-sort-value="ZZZZ" |
| data-sort-value="726,00" | VII/2, 6
| data-sort-value="German Dances, 06, D 820" | Six German Dances, D 820
| data-sort-value="key I" | Various keys
| data-sort-value="1824-10-01" | October1824
| For piano
|-
| 821
| 821
| data-sort-value="XXX,1871" | (1871)
| data-sort-value="0800,008" | VIIINo. 8
| data-sort-value="608,06" | VI, 8 No. 6
| Arpeggione Sonata
| data-sort-value="key A minor" | A minor
| data-sort-value="1824-11-01" | November1824
| Allegro moderato – Adagio – Allegretto
|-
| 822
| 822
| data-sort-value="XXX,1842" | (1842)
| data-sort-value="2008,464" | XX, 8No. 464
| data-sort-value="303,76" | III, 3 Anh. II No. 6
| Lied eines Kriegers
| data-sort-value="text Des stolzen Mannerlebens schonste Zeichen" | Des stolzen Männerlebens schönste Zeichen
| data-sort-value="1824-12-30" | 31/12/1824
| For b, unison men's choir and piano
|}

Lists of compositions by Franz Schubert
Compositions by Franz Schubert
Schubert